Cerberus FTP Server is a Windows-based FTP server with support for encrypted FTP sessions via FTPS and SFTP as well as web client support via HTTP and HTTPS. The server exposes files using a virtual file system and supports user authentication via built-in users and groups, Active Directory, LDAP and public key authentication.  The server is currently developed and supported by Cerberus, LLC.

See also
Comparison of FTP server software

References

External links
Cerberus FTP Server Home Page

FTP server software
Windows Internet software